Nasser Mansi Dessouky Ahmed Elsayed (born 16 November 1997), is an Egyptian footballer who plays for Egyptian Premier League side Zamalek SC as a forward.

Honours

Egypt
Africa U-23 Cup of Nations Champions: 2019

References

1997 births
Living people
Egyptian footballers
Association football forwards
Egyptian Premier League players
Egypt youth international footballers
El Shams SC players
El Dakhleya SC players
Pyramids FC players
Tala'ea El Gaish SC players
Footballers at the 2020 Summer Olympics
Olympic footballers of Egypt